Robert Prosper Georges Gelée (7 February 1880 – 26 March 1951) was a French rower. He competed in two events at the 1900 Summer Olympics.

References

External links

1880 births
1951 deaths
French male rowers
Olympic rowers of France
Rowers at the 1900 Summer Olympics
Sportspeople from Seine-Maritime